The Re 420, originally (and still widely called) Re 4/4II, series are the most common electric locomotives of the Swiss Federal Railways. They are used for passenger services throughout Switzerland alone or in pairs. For freight services, they are sometimes paired with the Re 620, especially in mountainous regions. That pairing is referred to by the term Re 10/10. The Re 430, originally known as the Re 4/4III, are a derivative of the Re 420 modified for higher traction but lower speed.

The Re 420 locomotives were produced over a period of 21 years, from 1964 to 1985.

Re 4/4III (Re 430 SBB/Re 436 Private) Subseries:
When Südostbahn had the opportunity to buy one of the first batch of 50 Re 4/4II locomotives before delivery, it had the gear modified for higher traction and lower speed for the steep routes of the SOB. This locomotive was delivered as number 41 (and is now SBB 11350). Based on the SOB experience, the SBB ordered a batch of 20 Re 4/4III in 1969 for use on the Gotthard route (three of those loks were sold to the SOB in the 1980s and were renumbered Re 4/4 42–44. Those loks were returned to the SBB between 1996 and 1998 in exchange for the four prototype Re 4/4IV which have since operated as Re 446. The predecessors of Regionalverkehr Mittelland (EBT-VHB-SMB) ordered a total of five Re 4/4III (111–113, 141, 181, later 111–115) which were working as Re 436 111–115 for Crossrail AG until that company was dissolved in 2017. Re 436 111, 112, 114 & 115 were sold to Widmer Rail Services AG in 2017. 

Six Re 4/4II (11196 to 11201; later 11195 to 11200) were equipped with a wider pantograph wiper in order to conform with DB and ÖBB standards, which allowed these units to operate EuroCity trains over the border to Bregenz and Lindau. These workings are now covered by the last series, 11371 to 11397, which were  rebuilt for use in Germany and Austria, not only with a different pantograph but also Indusi and other things necessary for use abroad. These locomotives are classified Re 421 and are lettered for SBB Cargo but also pull passenger trains to Bregenz and Lindau. (11382 was never converted as it was already withdrawn with fire damage)

30 locomotives of the passenger division (11201–11230) will be rebuilt for peak hour services with double deck cars in S-Bahn Zürich, starting in 2011. A consist will be built up by 6 (7 consists) or 10 (6 consists) double deckers plus one locomotive at each end.

On 1 September 1999 locomotives 11101-155, 181, 191–270 and 299–304 were assigned to SBB passenger division, 11156–171, 11173–180, 11182–190, 11271–298, 11305–311, 11313–349 and 11371–397 to freight division (becoming SBB Cargo afterwards). At the end of 2002 11172" ex-MThB joined the passenger fleet, one year later 11225–264 changed to SBB Cargo. At the end of 2004 11225–230 were changed against 11265–270 and six locomotives sold to BLS (see list). One year later 11102–107 followed and were replaced in the passenger fleet by 11156–159, 161 and 164 from SBB Cargo.

12 locomotives have been withdrawn by 2010, 96 locomotives are owned by the passenger division, 6 by BLS and all others by SBB Cargo
 P (Basel shunting duty): 11101 and 11120
 P: 11108...159 (44), 11161, 11164, 11172 II (ex MThB 21), 11181, 11191–11230, 11299–11304
 SBB Cargo: 420 ... resp.. 11...: 160, 162, 163, 165–171 173–180, 182–190, 231–281, 283–298, 305–311, 313–322, 324–349 and 421 371–381, 383–397
 BLS 420 501–506 (ex 11110, 11117, 11119, 11123, 11137 and 11142)
 withdrawn:
11113   +31.08.04  accident Zurich Oerlikon 24.10.03 
11172 I +31.12.78  accident Vaumarcus 09.12.78 
11282   +31.12.75  head-on collision with Ae 4/7 10906 near Landquart
11312   +31.10.85  collision at Renens 14.09.85 with Ae 4/7 10940+11011
11323   +01.06.05  fire damage at Steinen 23.03.05
11382   +02.07.02  fire damage 31.01.2002

BLS 420 507-420 512 (ex 11107, 11102–11106) withdrawn September 2009 as surplus

Pictures

See also
 List of stock used by Swiss Federal Railways

Sources

 This article was mostly translated from the German language version of December 2006.

External links 

 Re 4/4II (Re 420) and Re 4/4III (Re 430) by P.N. Rietsch
 Spec Sheet 

15 kV AC locomotives
Re 420
Bo′Bo′ locomotives
Electric locomotives of Switzerland
SLM locomotives
Standard gauge locomotives of Switzerland
Railway locomotives introduced in 1964